The Nuyts Archipelago is an island group located in South Australia in the Great Australian Bight to the south of the town of Ceduna on the west coast of the Eyre Peninsula. It consisting of mostly granitic islands and reefs that provide breeding sites for Australian sea lions and support colonies of short-tailed shearwater. It also includes the island group known as the Isles of St Francis. All the islands with exception of a part of Evans Island, are located within the following protected areas: the Nuyts Archipelago Wilderness Protection Area and the Nuyts Archipelago Conservation Park.

Description
Of the roughly 30 islands and reefs in the archipelago, those lying furthest from the coast of the Eyre Peninsula are known as the Isles of St Francis, after the largest.  Most of the islands are formed of calcarenite lying on granite; where the softer calcarenite is close to sea level it has been heavily eroded by wave action.

The area is biologically unique in South Australia due to the influence of the Leeuwin Current, flowing eastwards across the Great Australian Bight and bringing features more typical of western than south-eastern Australia. In and around the archipelago the subtropical Leeuwin Current meets and mixes with the colder waters of the Flinders Current creating a biodiversity hotspot. Examples of the effect of the Leeuwin Current include the presence of plate corals and fish such as the Western Footballer.

History
Prior to the last ice age, approximately 9,800 years ago, the islands formed part of the mainland coastline.

The archipelago was named in 1802 by Matthew Flinders after Dutch diplomat Pieter Nuyts, who was the senior official of the Dutch East India Company on the ship 't Gulden Zeepaert ("The Golden Seahorse"), captained by François Thijssen who mapped 1800km of the southern coastline of Australia from Albany to Ceduna in the course of a 1626–27 voyage from the Netherlands to Formosa and Japan. Nuyts was in the region of the archipelago in January 1627. The remote and desolate islands were later arguably also used as a source in the 1726 novel Gulliver’s Travels. Both Flinders and Nicolas Baudin, who also explored the area in 1802-1803, named several of the islands.

During the early 19th century the archipelago and adjacent coast were used as a base for sealing and for whaling, usually by Hobart-based entrepreneurs who established whaling stations on St Peter Island as well as at Fowlers Bay and Streaky Bay. Early interactions by sealers with the mainland native people were usually hostile. Later, the islands were privately purchased in 1925 and used for farming and sheep grazing.

List of constituent islands

St Francis Island
St Francis Island was named in 1627 by Thijssen after his patron saint, at  it is the second largest island in the archipelago. It is covered by a mix of grassland, saltbush and low shrubland and supports a large population of muttonbirds (estimated at 273,000 pairs). It has a long history of agricultural use as well as of guano mining.

Masillon Island
It is vegetated with heathy shrubland and saltbush, and supports muttonbirds (39,520 pairs).

Fenelon Island
It features heathland on shallow soils and supports a large population of white-faced storm petrels (13,000 pairs), as well as a sea lion breeding colony.

Smooth Island

Egg Island
It has deep soils and muttonbirds (400 pairs).

Dog Island
Dog Island is located about east-north-east of St Francis, it has saltbush shrubland and muttonbirds (1816 pairs).

Freeling Island
The island first  obtained protected area status as a fauna conservation reserve declared under the Crown Lands Act 1929-1966 on 16 March 1967  .
It has muttonbirds (112 pairs).

West Island
It supports a sea lion breeding colony.

Lacy Island
It has low heath, shrubland, and supports muttonbirds (4740 pairs).

Hart Island
Hart Island was named after Captain John Hart, a Premier of South Australia.

Evans Island
Evans Island is located about between the two protected areas but is part of neither.  It serves as a lighthouse reserve managed by the Australian Maritime Safety Authority (AMSA).  It features Marsh Saltbush shrubland on deep soils, and supports muttonbirds (29,472 pairs).

St Peter Island
It lies only  from the mainland and was farmed from 1859 until it was added to the conservation park in 1988. Since sheep grazing ceased the vegetation has become dominated by regenerating native plant communities with patches of mallee woodland. It was named in 1627 by Thijssen after Nuyts' patron saint.

Gliddon Reef
Gliddon Reef is an islet to the south-west of St Peter, it supports a sea lion breeding colony.

Purdie Islands
Purdie Islands are little more than a chain of low rocks, they were named by Flinders on 3 February 1802 after Robert Purdie, the surgeon’s assistant on the Investigator.  They support a sea lion breeding colony.

Lounds Island
Lounds Island is covered by low, dense vegetation, it was named by Flinders on 7 February 1802 after midshipman Sherrard Lound.  It supports a sea lion breeding colony.

Goat Island
Goat Island is a   island lying 2 km south-west of St Peter Island, it supports muttonbirds (94,800 pairs).  The wreck of the single-screw steamer, Eleni K (originally Johns Hopkins) lies on the north side of the island.

Breakwater Island
Breakwater Island is an islet to the south-east of Goat Island, it supports a sea lion breeding colony.

Eyre Island
Eyre Island is a sand island supporting large numbers of pied oystercatchers, it was named after explorer Edward John Eyre.  The island first  obtained protected area status as a fauna conservation reserve declared under the Crown Lands Act 1929-1966 on 16 March 1967  .

Franklin Islands
Franklin Islands – both East and West Franklin Islands are covered by nitre bush on deep soils, with breeding muttonbirds (102,080 pairs).  They were named by Flinders on 3 February 1802 after midshipman John Franklin who was later to become well known as a polar explorer.  Similar calcarenite-capped plateaus on granite platforms, the islands are joined at low tide by a strip of sand.  Once part of the St Francis Island pastoral lease, they were occasionally used for grazing sheep.  Public access to the Franklin Islands is prohibited, to safeguard the relict population of stick-nest rats there.

Lilliput and Blefescu Islands
Lilliput and Blefescu Islands are  small islets which were only officially named in 2007, lying off East and West Franklin respectively, they both support sea lion breeding colonies.

Other animals
Tiger snakes and southern carpet pythons occur in the archipelago.  Greater stick-nest rats are found on the Franklin Islands.  An isolated subspecies of the southern brown bandicoot (Isoodon obesulus nauticus) is endemic to the archipelago and confined to St Francis and the Franklin Islands.  An unsuccessful attempt was made to reestablish a colony of brush-tailed bettongs on St Francis Island, where the species had previously become extinct; a similar introduction to St Peter Island has been more successful.  The archipelago is important for Australian sea lions; it contains eight breeding colonies as well as several haul-out sites.  southern fur seals also use haul-out sites in the archipelago, while southern right whales migrate along the coast from May to October.

Protected area status and other arrangements

Statutory reserves

The majority of islands within the group are within the Nuyts Archipelago Wilderness Protection Area which was proclaimed on 25 August 2011 and was excised from all of the Isles of St Francis Conservation Park and from  the Nuyts Archipelago Conservation with exception to Eyre Island and St Peter Island. Evans Island which was previously unalienated Crown land has only partially included in the wilderness protection area as part of the island is held by AMSA for use as a site for a lighthouse. The waters around the archipelago and adjoining the mainland have been within the 4000 km2 Nuyts Archipelago Marine Park since 2012.

Non-statutory arrangements

Important Bird Area
The archipelago, with the exception of Hart Island, has been identified by BirdLife International as a 110 km2 Important Bird Area (IBA) because it contains over 1% of the world populations of short-tailed shearwaters (with an estimated maximum of 890,740 breeding pairs), white-faced storm-petrels (22,750 breeding pairs) and pied oystercatchers (about 250 individuals). Other birds nesting in the IBA include little penguins (over 1000 pairs), Pacific gulls (about eight pairs), Caspian terns (about 250 pairs) and crested terns (at least 3000 pairs), as well as eastern reef egrets, ospreys, white-bellied sea eagles and hooded plovers.  Rock parrots occur on Lounds Island and probably Smooth Island.

See also
List of archipelagos
Murat Commonwealth Marine Reserve

References

Islands of South Australia
Great Australian Bight